Eric Philips OAM (born April 1962) is an Australian polar explorer, adventurer and polar guide.

Philips has completed ski expeditions across icecaps on Greenland, Ellesmere Island, Iceland, Svalbard and Patagonia icecaps. He was the first Australian, together with companion Jon Muir, to ski to both the North Pole and South Pole. Philips skied to the North Pole from Siberia in 2002, producing a film, Icetrek North Pole, and has since guided numerous commercial North Pole expeditions, including the North Pole to Canada leg of Pat Farmer's Pole to Pole Run in 2011.

In 2013 Eric was a guide with UK charity Walking With The Wounded during their South Pole Allied Challenge. Together with celebrities Prince Harry, Dominic West and Alexander Skarsgard, three teams of wounded soldiers from the UK, USA, Australia and Canada skied 200km to the South Pole. Also in 2013, Eric guided Greenpeace on a short ski expedition to the North Pole where a symbolic capsule containing 2.7 million signatures and a message to the future was lowered to the sea bed.

In 1998-99, together with Jon Muir and Peter Hillary, Philips skied from McMurdo Station in Antarctica to the South Pole via the Ross Ice Shelf and Shackleton Glacier. This 84-day, 1425 km ski expedition utilised traction kites to harness the wind. A film, Into the Teeth of the Blizzard, was produced about this expedition. Philips also guided a 925 km commercial ski expedition from the Ronne Ice Shelf to the South Pole in 2007-08 and in 2012 guided Pat Farmer on his Arctic leg from Union Glacier camp to the South Pole.

In 2004 Eric was awarded a Medal of the Order of Australia (OAM) for achievements in polar exploration. He is the co-founder and president of the International Polar Guides Association.

In 1995 Philips completed a ski/kite/kayak traverse of Greenland from Tasiilaq to Kangerlussuaq, resulting in the Emmy Award-winning film, Chasing the Midnight Sun. He used similar methods to cross the South Patagonian Icecap from Chile to Argentina, producing the film, Riding the Tempest. Philips has also skied across icecaps in Iceland (2003) and Ellesmere Island (1992) and in 2008 skied from Ny-Ålesund to Longyearbyen on the island of Spitsbergen.

In 1996-97 Philips worked as a Field Training Officer at Mawson Station for the Australian Antarctic Division and again in 2008-09 as Field Leader of the International Polar Year AGAP North project. In 2006-07 he sailed with his family on board the ice-strengthened ship Sarsen to Commonwealth Bay in Antarctica and in 2009 circumnavigated Greenland on board Greenpeace's icebreaker, Arctic Sunrise as part of their Climate Impacts expedition.

He has also cycle toured through Patagonia and Tierra del Fuego, around the South Island of New Zealand and from the Netherlands to Egypt.

Philips studied at the University of South Australia, attaining a Diploma of Teaching, a Bachelor of Education and Graduate Diploma in Outdoor Education. He was the Director of Outdoor Education at the renowned Timbertop campus of Geelong Grammar School.

Through his experiences Philips has developed alternative and highly effective methods of travel in the polar regions and has embraced the use of specialized plastics in the construction of polar-specific equipment. He is the inventor of the Flexi ski binding, used extensively by polar adventurers.

Philips is the author of Icetrek. The Bitter Journey to the South Pole.

Philips lives in Hobart, Australia with his wife, Susy, daughter, Mardi and son, Kip, where he runs his own guiding business.

References

External links
 Personal Site
 Icetrek Site
 IPGA Profile
 G-Layer page

People from Hobart
1962 births
Living people
Recipients of the Medal of the Order of Australia